Vasileios Petimezas or Petmezas (1785–1872)  was a Greek revolutionary leader during the Greek War of Independence, politician and general.

Life
Vasileios Petimezas hailed from the important  clan of the Petimezas or Petmezas from the village of Soudena, near Kalavryta. He was born in 1785 as the son of Athanasios Petimezas.

After his father was murdered in 1804 he fled to British-held Zakynthos, and enrolled in the British-sponsored Greek light infantry units there, along with his brother Nikolaos.

He returned to the Peloponnese at the outbreak of the Greek War of Independence, and fought in several battles at Kalavryta, Levidi, Corinth, Argos, Akrata, and Trikorfa, as well as the campaign against Mustafa Pasha Bushatli. In 1826, with 600 men, he and his brother NIkolaos occupied Mega Spilaio and drove back the attacks of Ibrahim Pasha of Egypt. 

He was elected representative to the Greek national assemblies, and later as MP to the Hellenic Parliament. He reached the rank of lieutenant general.

He died in 1872.

References

Sources
 

1785 births
1872 deaths
Greek military leaders of the Greek War of Independence
Vasileios
1st Regiment Greek Light Infantry officers
People from Kalavryta
Hellenic Army lieutenant generals
Members of the Royal Phalanx
Members of the Hellenic Parliament